Stage is a live album released by the American hard rock band Great White in 1995. It was put together by Alan Niven, Great White's former manager, as a contractual release for Zoo Entertainment. The first six tracks of the CD come from a 1994 House of Blues benefit concert (Stage One) and the other songs from a 1993 Anaheim show (Stage Two), several tracks of which were previously featured as a bonus on the studio album Sail Away. The initial Japanese pressing was a two-disc set, and featured one bonus track for each show.

The songs of this album, with the exception of "Maybe Someday" and "Congo Square", were re-issued in 2004 by BMG Special Products, with the title Extended Versions. This album was reissued again on both CD and Vinyl on February 21, 2020, by Deadline Music.

Track listing

Stage one 
"Train to Nowhere" – 4:43
"Sail Away" – 5:09
"House of Broken Love" – 6:31
"Maybe Someday" – 7:48
"Congo Square" – 7:24
"Afterglow" – 6:06

Stage two 
"Face the Day" – 5:43
"Old Rose Motel" – 6:26
"Babe (I'm Gonna Leave You)" – 7:15
"Rock Me" – 7:29
"Can't Shake It" – 5:24
"Once Bitten, Twice Shy" – 5:40

Japanese edition bonus tracks 
"Gone with the Wind"
"Love Is a Lie"

Personnel

Band members 
Jack Russell – lead and backing vocals
Mark Kendall – guitar, backing vocals
Michael Lardie – guitar, keyboards, backing vocals, producer, mixing
Teddy Cook – bass, backing vocals
Audie Desbrow – drums

Production 
Alan Niven – producer, mixing
Wyn Davis – engineer 1994 concert
Biff Dawes, Doug Field, Philip Kneebone, Dennis Mays – engineers 1993 concert

References 

Great White live albums
1995 live albums
2004 live albums